Riasti, Bhawalpuri or Choolistani is a Saraiki dialect spoken in a wide area in Pakistani Punjab on the banks of the river Sutlej and in the Cholistan Desert.

Sub-dialects of Riasti
Bhawalpuri
Choolistani

Dialect speaking areas
These 3 districts speak this dialect cluster:
Bahawalpur District 
Rahim Yar Khan District 
Lodhran District

See also
Thali dialect
Cholistan Desert
Rahim Yar Khan District 
Lodhran District

References 

Languages of Punjab, Pakistan
Punjabi dialects